The Joe Chase Adams House, also known as The Ledges, is a historic house in Lewisburg, Tennessee, U.S.. It was built in 1900 for Joe Chase Adams, a dry goods merchant who served as the mayor of Lewisburg. It was designed in the Queen Anne architectural style. Adams's granddaughter, Mrs. Ernest Wheeler Henegar, Sr. purchased the house in 1943; she subsequently hired Bill Knox to redesign the interiors. It has been listed on the National Register of Historic Places since December 2, 1993.

References

Houses on the National Register of Historic Places in Tennessee
Queen Anne architecture in Tennessee
Houses completed in 1900
National Register of Historic Places in Marshall County, Tennessee